Mark Antony is a 2000 Indian Malayalam film,  directed by  T. S. Suresh Babu and produced by Safeel and Minraj. Story by Shaji T Nedumkallel and screenplay and dialogue By Kaloor Dennis.  The film stars Suresh Gopi, Divya Unni, Janardanan and Lalu Alex in lead roles. The film had musical score by Berny-Ignatius.

Cast

Suresh Gopi as Parel Antony
Janardanan as Parel Pappu Chattu
Madhupal as Parel Pappachan
Baiju as Parel Kariyachan
Divya Unni as Mambally Nimmy
Lalu Alex as Fr. Parel Urumees
VK Sreeraman as Mambally Chakkappan
Adoor Bhavani as Kunjeli
Bheeman Raghu as Mambally Kuriachen
Jagannatha Varma as Bishop
K. P. A. C. Lalitha as Kunjoutha
N. F. Varghese as Mullakka
Augustine as Sexton Devassy
Kollam Ajith as S.I. Jagathnathan
Sadiq as Babu 
Mala Aravindan as C.K. Ayyappan
Mohan Jose as Ravikuttan
Shammi Thilakan as Rajan
Kaveri as Kunjipennu/Reeja
Ravi Menon as Nair
 Shaju as Unnikrishna Varma
Mani C. Kappen as Pankajakshan
 Vimal Raj as Bhairavan
Keerikkadan Jose as Muthala Varkey
Indrans as Antony's friend
Bindu Panicker as Nimmi's mother
Vijayan Peringod as Unnikrishna Varma's Father

Soundtrack

References

External links
 
 

2000 films
2000s Malayalam-language films
Films directed by T. S. Suresh Babu
Films scored by Berny–Ignatius